Sixth Church of Christ, Scientist may refer to:

 Sixth Church of Christ, Scientist (Seattle, Washington)
 Sixth Church of Christ, Scientist (Milwaukee, Wisconsin) 
 Sixth Church of Christ Scientist (Portland, Oregon), designed by architect Morris H. Whitehouse